Burgruine Gmünd is a castle in Carinthia, Austria. Burgruine Gmünd is situated at an elevation of 768 m.

See also
List of castles in Austria

References

Castles in Carinthia (state)